The 2017 Isle of Wight Council election took place on 4 May 2017 as part of the 2017 local elections in the United Kingdom. All 40 Councillors were elected from 39 electoral divisions, which each returned either one or two Councillors by first-past-the-post voting for a four-year term of office.

The result of the election saw the Isle of Wight Conservatives re-take majority control of the Isle of Wight Council after electing 25 Councillors. The Island Independents, who after the previous election had formed the ruling group dropped to nine. Elsewhere, the Liberal Democrats had a net gain of one, whilst Labour had a net loss of one. The results also saw the Green Party gain its first Isle of Wight Councillor, whilst UKIP lost both of its two Councillors.

Results summary

|}

Ward results
All wards elect one Councillor (unless otherwise stated) to the Isle of Wight Council by the First past the post system of voting. The total number of votes and turnout in each ward includes spoilt ballot papers.

References

2017
2017 English local elections
21st century on the Isle of Wight